Discorama is a French musical television show, created and presented by Denise Glaser and broadcast from 1959 - 1975 on RTF.

References

External links

1959 French television series debuts
1975 French television series endings
1960s French television series
French music television series